A kip is a US customary unit of force. It equals 1000 pounds-force, and is used primarily by structural engineers to indicate forces where the value represented in pound-force is inefficient. Although uncommon, it is occasionally also considered a unit of mass, equal to 1000 pounds (i.e. one half of a short ton). Another use is as a unit of deadweight to compute shipping charges.  

1 kip ≈  = 

The name comes from combining the words kilo and pound; it is occasionally called a kilopound.  Its symbol is kip, sometimes K (upper or lowercase), or less frequently, klb. When it is necessary to clearly distinguish it as a unit of force rather than mass, it is sometimes called the kip-force (symbol kipf or klbf).

The symbol kp usually stands for the kilopond, a unit of force, or kilogram-force, used primarily in Europe prior to the introduction of SI units.

The kip is also the name of a unit of mass equal to approximately 9.19 kilograms. This usage is obsolete, and was used in Malaysia.

See also
 Short ton-force

References

Units of force
Units of mass
Customary units of measurement in the United States